The 2022 United States Senate election in Maryland was held on November 8, 2022, to elect a member of the United States Senate to represent Maryland. The Democratic and Republican primaries were held on July 19, 2022.

Incumbent Democratic Senator Chris Van Hollen was first elected in 2016 with 60.9% of the vote, winning the seat of retiring incumbent Barbara Mikulski. He ran for a second term against Chris Chaffee, the Republican nominee.

Shortly after polls closed on November 8, 2022, the Associated Press called the race for Van Hollen.

Democratic primary

Candidates

Nominee
Chris Van Hollen, incumbent U.S. senator

Eliminated in primary
Michelle Laurence Smith, federal employee and business owner

Endorsements

Results

Republican primary

Candidates

Nominee 
 Chris Chaffee, homebuilding contractor and perennial candidate

Eliminated in primary 
 George Davis, engineer
 Nnabu Eze, IT contractor and perennial candidate
 Lorie Friend, nurse
 Jon McGreevey, a.k.a. Ryan Dark White, adult bookstore employee and believer in the QAnon conspiracy theory
 Joseph Perez, IT project manager
 Todd Puglisi, grocery store clerk
 James Tarantin, entrepreneur
 John Thormann, contractual consultant

Declined
Andy Harris, U.S. Representative for Maryland's 1st congressional district (2011–present) (ran for re-election)
Larry Hogan, Governor of Maryland (2015–2023)

Endorsements

Results

Other candidates

Write-in

Declared
Scottie Griffin (Democratic)
Andrew Wildman (Unaffiliated)

General election

Predictions

Endorsements

Polling

Chris Van Hollen vs. Larry Hogan

Results 

Counties that flipped from Republican to Democratic
 Anne Arundel (largest municipality: Glen Burnie)
 Frederick (largest municipality: Frederick)
 Kent (largest municipality: Chestertown)
 Talbot (largest municipality: Easton)

Notes

Partisan clients

See also
 Elections in Maryland
 2022 United States elections
 2022 Maryland gubernatorial election
 2022 Maryland Attorney General election
 2022 Maryland Senate elections
 2022 Maryland Comptroller election
 2022 United States House of Representatives elections in Maryland
 2022 United States gubernatorial elections
 2022 Maryland House of Delegates election

References

External links 
Official campaign websites
 Chris Chaffee (R) for Senate
 Chris Van Hollen (D) for Senate

2022
Maryland
United States Senate